Twelve U.S. states have designated a horse breed as the official state horse. The first state horse was designated in Vermont in 1961. The most recent state designations occurred in 2010, when North Carolina and South Carolina both declared state breeds. There have been proposals to designate a state horse in Oregon as well as in Arizona (where an ongoing campaign sought to designate the Colonial Spanish Horse as the state horse prior to the state centennial in 2012), but neither proposal is yet successful. In one state, North Dakota, the state horse is officially designated the "honorary state equine." Two additional states have not designated a specific state horse, but have designed a horse or horse breed as its official state animals: the horse in New Jersey and the Morgan horse breed in Vermont.

Some breeds, such as the American Quarter Horse in Texas and the Morgan horse in Vermont and Massachusetts, were named as the state horse because of the close connection between the history of the breed and the state. Others, including the Tennessee Walking Horse and the Missouri Fox Trotter, include the state in the official breed name. School children have been persuasive lobbyists for the cause of some state horses, such as the Colonial Spanish Horse being named the state horse of North Carolina due to the presence of the Spanish-descended Banker horses in the Outer Banks, while others have been brought to official status through the lobbying efforts of their breed registries.

Official state horses are one of many state symbols officially designated by states. Each state has its own flag and state seal, and many states also designate other symbols, including animals, plants, and foods. Such items usually are designated because of their ties to the culture or history of that particular state. In addition to being state symbols in their own right, horses have also appeared in state symbols; for example, a horse's head appears on the Seal of New Jersey.


State horses

Proposed breeds

State symbols
Horses, both official state horses and not, are present in the emblems of several states.

See also
Lists of U.S. state animals

References

External links

.States
Horses
state horses
Horses in culture